Dunayev or Dunaev is a Russian male surname, its feminine counterpart is Dunayeva or Dunaeva. It may refer to:

Alexander Dunaev, Russian politician
Andrey Dunayev (born 1949), Russian swimmer
Arman Dunayev (born 1966), Khazakh politician

Russian-language surnames